The Cape Charles Museum and Welcome Center is located at 814 Randolph Avenue, Cape Charles, Virginia, United States.  The museum contains exhibits detailing the history and development of Cape Charles and the surrounding region.  A large Busch-Sulzer engine and Westinghouse generator serve as the centerpieces of the museum.

Notes

External links
Cape Charles Museum and Welcome Center.  Museum information from Small Museums Association website.

History museums in Virginia
Museums in Northampton County, Virginia
Museums established in 1996
1996 establishments in Virginia